is a Japanese novel series written by Mizuki Tsujimura. It was published by Kodansha in three volumes, from June to August 2004.

A manga adaptation, illustrated by Naoshi Arakawa, was serialized in Kodansha's Monthly Shōnen Magazine from December 2007 to April 2009 and later published in four tankōbon volumes. The manga is licensed in English by Vertical.

Media

Novels
The series was written by Mizuki Tsujimura, and published by Kodansha in three volumes released from June 8, 2004 to August 6, 2004. The series was re-published in two volumes on August 11, 2007. It was the first published work by Tsujimura.

Volume list

Original release

Re-release

Manga
A manga adaptation, illustrated by Naoshi Arakawa, was serialized in Monthly Shōnen Magazine from December 2007 to April 2009. Kodansha published the series in four volumes. It was Arakawa's first work that was serialized in a magazine.

On June 17, 2020, Vertical announced they licensed the series for English publication. The series is also licensed in Taiwan by Tong Li Publishing.

Volume list

Reception
The novel series was awarded the Mephisto Prize in 2004.

Demelza from Anime UK News praised the first volume of the manga adaptation for its characters, story, and artwork, ultimately stating "it [delivered] a memorable experience".

References

External links
 

2004 Japanese novels
Japanese mystery novels
Kodansha books
Kodansha manga
Mystery anime and manga
Shōnen manga
Vertical (publisher) titles